Wilczek is a surname of Polish-language origin. A diminutive form of Wilk, it means "little wolf" in Polish. It is used by 9,000–10,000 people in Poland, with the greatest number found in Silesia, Podhale, the Warsaw region, Lublin and Łańcut. The surname may refer to:

People
 Ernő Wilczek (1883–1950), Hungarian engineer
 Ernst Wilczek (1867–1948), Swiss botanist
 Erwin Wilczek (1940–2021), retired Polish soccer player
 Frank Wilczek (born 1951), Nobel laureate physicist
 Georgina von Wilczek (1921–1989), member of the royal family of Liechtenstein
 Count Johann Nepomuk Wilczek (1837–1922), sponsor of Polar expeditions and artists
 Kamil Wilczek (born 1988), Polish footballer
 Marcin Wilczek (born 1967), Polish diplomat
 Mieczysław Wilczek (1932–2014), Polish politician, chemist and businessman
 Piotr Wilczek (born 1962), Polish historian, Ambassador of Poland to the United States
 Sylwester Wilczek (born 1936), Polish ice hockey player

See also
 

Polish-language surnames